The 2012–13 IUPUI Jaguars men's basketball team represented Indiana University – Purdue University Indianapolis during the 2012–13 NCAA Division I men's basketball season. The Jaguars, led by second year head coach Todd Howard, played their home games at IUPUI Gymnasium (better known as The Jungle), with three games at Bankers Life Fieldhouse, and were members of The Summit League. They finished the season 6–26, 1–15 in The Summit League play to finish in last place. They lost in the quarterfinals of The Summit League tournament to South Dakota State.

Roster

Schedule

|-
!colspan=9| Exhibition

|-
!colspan=9| Regular season

|-
!colspan=9| 2013 The Summit League men's basketball tournament

References

IUPUI Jaguars men's basketball seasons
IUPUI
IUPUI Jaguars men's basketball
Valp Indiana